Specair is a specialist airline which carries out testing and calibration of flight equipment as well as search-and-rescue missions and aircraft maintenance.

Fleet

References

External links
Official website (Russian)

Airlines of Russia
Companies based in Moscow